Bengt Karl Åke Johansson (4 January 1937 – 27 September 2021) was a Swedish politician. A member of the Swedish Social Democratic Party, he served as Minister for Consumer Affairs and Deputy Minister of Finance from 1985 to 1988, Minister for Civil Service Affairs from 1988 to 1991, and governor of Älvsborg County from 1991 to 1997.

References

1937 births
2021 deaths
Swedish Social Democratic Party politicians
20th-century Swedish politicians
Government ministers of Sweden
People from Borås Municipality